The Jurong Town Hall, or Trade Association Hub (TA Hub) is a commercial building and the former headquarters of the Jurong Town Corporation. The building is symbolic of the success of Singapore's industrialisation programme in Jurong and was gazetted as a national monument on 2 June 2015. It served as a hub space for head start technology companies in the 2000s. The building was further developed into a new hub for trade associations with Singapore Chinese Chamber of Commerce and Industry as the anchor tenant by 2017. The road Jurong Town Hall Road was named after this building.

Gallery

Tenants of Trade Association Hub (TA Hub)
 Singapore Institute of Purchasing and Materials Management (SIPMM)
 Singapore Vehicle Traders Association (SVTA)
 Container Depot and Logistics Association (CDLA)
 Singapore Food Manufacturers' Association (SFMA)

See also
 JTC Corporation
 Singapore Chinese Chamber of Commerce and Industry (SCCCI)
 Jurong Town Hall Road

External links

National monuments of Singapore
Office buildings completed in 1974
1975 establishments in Singapore
Jurong
Places in Singapore
Landmarks in Singapore
20th-century architecture in Singapore